Avayalik is an island at the far north of the Labrador Peninsula in the Canadian province of Newfoundland and Labrador. It is a possible site of early Norse colonization of North America.

See also 
L'Anse aux Meadows

References 
Richard H. Jordan, "Preliminary Results from Archaeological Investigations on Avayalik Island, Extreme Northern Labrador" in Arctic Vol. 33, No. 3 (Sep., 1980), pp. 607–627.

Viking Age in Canada
Islands of Newfoundland and Labrador